Vassyata is a rural locality (a selo) in Chaykovsky, Perm Krai, Russia. The population was 771 as of 2010. There are 8 streets.

Geography 
Vassyata is located 49 km northeast of Chaykovsky. Kizhi is the nearest rural locality.

References 

Rural localities in Chaykovsky urban okrug